Albert Friedrich Benno Dulk (1819–1884) was a German author.

Biography
Dulk was born in Königsberg to Friedrich Philipp Dulk (1788–1851). He studied medicine and the natural sciences in Königsberg and in Leipzig and Breslau. He took an active part in the popular uprisings of 1848, at which time his revolutionary drama Lea appeared. After traveling in the Orient, he settled in Geneva in 1850, and subsequently in Stuttgart, where he wrote the dramas Jesus der Christ (1865) and Simson (1859), in which play the conflict between Judaism and paganism is depicted. One of his later dramas, König Enzio, was set to music by Johann Joseph Abert.

As an adherent of socialism he became conspicuous, in 1871, through his opposition to the Franco-Prussian War, and his publications Patriotismus and Frömmigkeit obtained a wide circulation. In 1882 he founded in Stuttgart the first society of freethinkers in Germany, and during the last years of his life devoted his pen principally to the discussion of the radical side of religio-philosophical subjects.

References

1819 births
1884 deaths
Writers from Königsberg
19th-century German dramatists and playwrights
19th-century German male writers
People of the Revolutions of 1848
Forty-Eighters